The Nampho Dam or West Sea Dam, also known as the West Sea Barrage or West Sea Lock Gate, is a tidal barrage located 15 km west of the special city of Nampho, North Korea. It is a large, eight-km-long system of dams, three lock chambers, and 36 sluices, allowing the passage of ships up to 50,000 tons. The dam closes the Taedong River off from the Yellow Sea. It was built by the North Korean Army from 1981 to 1986, with the resources of the whole country directed to this main construction project. The West Sea Barrage Line runs over the dam.

The stated goal of the dam was:
 The prevention of seawater intrusion into the fresh water, thus solving the water supply problem;
 The irrigation of additional land, enlarging the arable territory of the region.

The dam is considered a major accomplishment of North Korea, and is a commonly seen backdrop for North Korean television news broadcasts from Korean Central News Agency.
It is also a popular stop for tour groups of international tourists, for whom there is a visitor centre on P'i Do Island where films are shown about the construction of the dam and the locks. 

The dam's estimated total cost was US$4 billion.Oh, Kong Dan & Ralph C. Hassig. North Korea Through the Looking Glass, Brookings Institution Press, 2000, p53

Notes
a  The term West Sea Gate or West Sea Lock are also used for a smaller dam located in Incheon, South Korea.

References

External links

 Interactive Virtual Tour of Nampo Dam
 
 North Korean propaganda film on the West Sea Barrage, via YouTube: Part 1, 2, 3

Dams in North Korea
South Pyongan
Dams completed in 1986
Tidal barrages
Buildings and structures in Nampo
1986 establishments in North Korea
20th-century architecture in North Korea